The 2011 Munster Senior Football Championship was that year's installment of the annual Munster Senior Football Championship held under the auspices of the Munster GAA. It was won by Kerry who defeated Cork in the final. This was Kerry's second consecutive appearance in the final and second consecutive title - they defeated Limerick in the 2010 final.

The winning Kerry team received the Munster Championship Cup, and automatically advanced to the quarter-final stage of the 2011 All-Ireland Senior Football Championship.

Bracket

Quarter-finals

Semi-finals

Final

See also
 Cork–Kerry Gaelic football rivalry

References

External links
Munster GAA website

2M
Munster Senior Football Championship